Michael L. Ducker was president and CEO of FedEx Freight and Vice Chair of the U.S. Chamber of Commerce Board of Directors. He was born in Chattanooga, Tennessee. Ducker received his M.B.A. from a joint program of the Kellogg School of Management at Northwestern University and the Hong Kong University of Science and Technology. Ducker retired from FedEx in August 2018.

References

Living people
Northwestern University alumni
Businesspeople from Tennessee
American chief executives
FedEx people
United States Chamber of Commerce people
Year of birth missing (living people)